Anthony Rose may refer to:

 Anthony Rose (boxer), Jamaican boxer
 Anthony Rose (wine), English wine writer
 Anthony Rose (entrepreneur), English technologist and entrepreneur